Members of the State Legislative Assembly, the only house of State Legislature in 22 states and 3 union territories of India and the lower house of 6 states, are elected by being voted upon by all adult citizens of India enlisted in the voter list of their respective state/union territory, from a set of candidates who stand in their respective constituencies. Every adult citizen of India can vote only in their constituency. Candidates who win the State Legislative Assembly elections are called 'Member of the Legislative Assembly' and hold their seats for five years or until the body is dissolved by the Governor of the respective state and Lieutenant Governor of the respective union territory on the advice of the Council of Ministers of the state/union territory headed by the Chief Minister. The assemblies meet on matters relating to creation of new laws, removing or improving the existing laws of the state as defined in the State List. Elections take place once in five years to elect the members for the state legislative assemblies.

Current legislative assemblies in India

* Union territory

Legislative Assembly elections by states

Elections in Andhra Pradesh
Elections in Arunachal Pradesh
Elections in Assam
Elections in Bihar
Elections in Chhattisgarh
Elections in Delhi
Elections in Goa
Elections in Gujarat
Elections in Haryana
Elections in Himachal Pradesh
Elections in Jammu and Kashmir
Elections in Jharkhand
Elections in Karnataka
Elections in Kerala
Elections in Madhya Pradesh
Elections in Maharashtra
Elections in Manipur
Elections in Meghalaya
Elections in Mizoram
Elections in Nagaland
Elections in Odisha
Elections in Puducherry
Elections in Punjab
Elections in Rajasthan
Elections in Sikkim
Elections in Tamil Nadu
Elections in Telangana
Elections in Tripura
Elections in Uttar Pradesh
Elections in Uttarakhand
Elections in West Bengal

See also
 Elections in India
 List of Indian presidential elections
 List of Indian vice presidential elections
 List of Rajya Sabha elections
 List of Indian general elections
 State governments of India
 State Legislature
 State legislative assemblies of India
 Member of the Legislative Assembly
 Federalism in India

References

External links
Haryana and Maharashtra Assembly Election Vote Counting Live

India
Elections in India
State Assembly elections in India
India politics-related lists